William Charles Anthony Gaunt (born 3 April 1937 in Pudsey, West Riding of Yorkshire) is an English actor. He became widely known for television roles such as Richard Barrett in The Champions (1968–1969), Arthur Crabtree in No Place Like Home (1983–87) and Andrew Prentice in Next of Kin (1995–97). He has had many other roles on television and also an extensive stage career as an actor and director, including performances with the Royal Shakespeare Company.

Early life
Gaunt's father was a solicitor. Gaunt attended Giggleswick School and Baylor University, Texas, and then the Royal Academy of Dramatic Art. He then spent three years working in repertory theatre at Worthing, Bath, Salisbury and Cheltenham after which he was in America for another year, later returning to the UK working on productions at Birmingham, Coventry and Cheltenham, interrupted by a spell in the army.

After minor roles in 1960s series such as Z-Cars and The Avengers, and the Edgar Wallace Mysteries films The Sinister Man (1961) and Solo for Sparrow (1962), he gained a role as the super-powered secret agent Richard Barrett in the 1968 British espionage/science fiction series The Champions. In 1966 he appeared in "Flight Plan", an episode of The Saint, where he played an Osprey pilot. He had also appeared in a recurring role in Sergeant Cork following policemen in Victorian London.  Between 1977-1978 he appeared in 22 of the 26 episode television series "The Foundation" in the role of Gareth Brown.

Later career
Between 1983 and 1987, he starred as harassed father Arthur Crabtree in the sitcom No Place Like Home. He subsequently made many guest appearances in other series such as Juliet Bravo and in the Doctor Who two-part serial Revelation of the Daleks (1985). From 1995 to 1997, Gaunt starred in the sitcom Next of Kin opposite Penelope Keith. In 2010, he appeared in the Globe Theatre production of Shakespeare's Henry IV, Part 1. He starred in the 2004 Doctor Who audio series Dalek Empire III. He also appeared in the Channel 4 series Cast Offs.

In December 2011, he was seen in Episode One of the ITV drama Without You. In February 2012, Gaunt appeared in Midsomer Murders as Ludo DeQuetteville in the episode "The Dark Rider", first aired on ITV1 on Wednesday 1 February 2012. This is his second appearance in this series, after playing Michael Bannerman in the 2004 episode "The Maid in Splendour".  In May 2015, Gaunt played Judge St John Redmond in six episodes of EastEnders.

Stage roles
Gaunt also has extensive stage experience, both as an actor and a theatre director, including a notable success in playing the Micheál Mac Liammóir character in Gates of Gold by Frank McGuinness at the Finborough Theatre, London, and in the West End.

He appeared in the Royal Shakespeare Company production of The Seagull, sharing the role of Sorin with Ian McKellen; and appeared in King Lear as Gloucester at the New London Theatre in Drury Lane, London, opposite McKellen in the title role following a United Kingdom tour. He revived his performance as Gloucester in the TV film of the same name released in late 2008. He appeared in the role of Dogsborough, a parody of Paul von Hindenburg in Bertold Brecht's The Resistible Rise of Arturo Ui, and in The Crucible at the Old Vic. In 2017 he appeared in a tour of Alan Bennett's play The Lady in the Van.

In 2021, Gaunt appeared as Duncan in Macbeth at the Almeida Theatre.

Personal life
Gaunt married actress Carolyn Lyster on 7 September 1974. They have a daughter, Matilda and a son, Albie.

Partial filmography
The Sinister Man (1961) – Mitch Hallam
Solo for Sparrow (1962) – Det. Sergeant Reeve
Sergeant Cork (1963–1968) – Bob Marriott
The Champions (1968) - Richard Barrett (TV Series) 
The Revolutionary (1970)
No Place Like Home  (1983-1987) as the main character Arthur Crabtree
Run for Your Wife (2012) – Man on Bus
The Timber (2015) - Jebediah

References

External links
 
"20 Questions With... William Gaunt", What's on Stage, 6 November 2006

Alumni of RADA
People from Pudsey
English male television actors
English male stage actors
English male radio actors
English male film actors
English male Shakespearean actors
Royal Shakespeare Company members
1937 births
Living people
20th-century English male actors
21st-century English male actors
Male actors from Yorkshire